Black Belt may refer to:

Martial arts
 Black belt (martial arts), an indication of attainment of expertise in martial arts
 Black Belt (magazine), a magazine covering martial arts news, technique, and notable individuals

Places
 Black Belt in the American South, A region of highly fertile black soil in the American South that was the center of slavery, and continues to have a large black population into the 21st century
 Black Belt (geological formation), geological formation of dark fertile soil in the Southern United States
 Black Belt (region of Alabama), a geographic and socio-political region of Alabama
 Black Belt (region of Chicago), a historical region in Chicago, Illinois, in the South Side area

Entertainment
Black Belt Jones, a 1974 action film
 Black Belt (1978 film), an Indian Malayalam film
 Black Belt (2007 film), a Japanese film, also known as Kuro-obi
 Black Belt (video game), game for Sega Master System based on the anime Fist of the North Star
 Black Belt (8-bit Theatre), a character in the webcomic 8-bit Theatre

Military 

 Operation Black Belt, Israeli code name for the November 2019 Gaza clashes